The Great St Bernard Tunnel is a road tunnel complementing the Great St Bernard Pass, linking Martigny (in the Swiss canton of Valais) with Saint-Rhémy-en-Bosses (in the Aosta Valley, in north western Italy).

Description
There is a toll to use the tunnel, payable in full even for drivers who already display on their vehicles a Swiss motorway vignette. The tunnel comprises a section of the E27 route linking Belfort with Aosta.

For most of its  length the tunnel runs in a straight line, but incorporating a gentle slope. At both ends, the approach road to the tunnel is covered by a gallery / avalanche shelter in order to minimize the risk of access to the tunnel being temporarily blocked during bad weather.

The name of the tunnel comes directly from that of the Grand St Bernard Pass, and thereby indirectly from the saint who in AD 1049 founded the hospice high above the tunnel, that also bears his name.   Tourists on the Swiss side additionally find themselves reminded by road side billboards of the saint's association with St Bernard dogs.

The Rhône Pipeline has carried oil through the tunnel since 1966.

Toll charges

History
Before the tunnel was constructed, the frontier was passable here only using the Great St Bernard Pass.   The pass remains an option in summer, but is normally closed by snow between October and May, and sometimes for longer.   The tunnel is intended to be usable for 365 days every year.

The tunnel was opened to traffic on 19 March 1964, having been under construction since 1958. It became the longest road tunnel in the world, surpassing the Vielha tunnel in the Pyrenees in Spain which was opened in 1948.

The approach roads have been progressively improved, and most recently the avalanche covers extended on the southern side. The Mont Blanc tunnel tragedy of 1999 prompted a major review of road tunnel safety in several countries including Switzerland, and significant safety upgrades are planned for the Grand St Bernard Tunnel. A speed limit of 80 km/h (50 mph) is already in force inside the tunnel.

Access and popularity
The tunnel and most of the connecting road between Aosta and Martigny are only single carriageway roads, and for most relevant city destinations in Switzerland and Italy the toll free St Gotthard Tunnel and Simplon Pass offer more direct or at least faster routes. This and the toll ensure that the Grand San Bernard Tunnel rarely suffers from the levels of holiday season congestion that plague the more popular Alpine crossing routes.

Notes

References

External links

Road tunnels in Switzerland
Buildings and structures in Valais
Transport in Aosta Valley
Tunnels completed in 1964
Toll tunnels in Europe
Tunnels in the Alps
1964 establishments in Italy
1964 establishments in Switzerland